Alan Fisher may refer to:

 Alan Fisher (broadcast journalist), Scottish broadcast journalist
 Alan Fisher (trade unionist) (1922–1988), British trade unionist
 Alan Fisher (architect) (1905–1978), American architect
 Allan George Barnard Fisher (1895–1976), New Zealand born economist